Bindusara (also called Bendsura) is a small river situated in the district of Beed in Maharashtra state of India. It is a tributary river of Sindphana and a sub-tributary of Godavari river.

Bindusara originates in the hills of Balaghat near the village Waghira, in south of district Beed in Patoda taluqa. There are hills nearby. The river receives its water from numerous little streams. On the banks of the Bindusara River is where the city of Beed is located.

Bendsura is a rapid and seasonal river. A reservoir; Bendsura Project (capacity 7.106 million cubic metres) was constructed on the river in 1955 near the village of Pāli, about 10 km south of Beed.

At some places the river is narrow and looks like a stream. The lack of vegetation and rocky and undulating terrain contributes to violent floods in heavy rains. These have repeatedly caused substantial loss of property and life in the history of Beed town, most recently on July 23, 1989, when a massive flooding of three habitations in the town caused a number of dead or missing and property losses of millions of rupees.

Bendsura river flows from south to north and meets Sindphana river, about 10 km north of Beed town. Total length of the river is about 40 km.

See also

List of rivers of India
Rivers of India

References

Rivers of Maharashtra
Rivers of India